Jak TV is an Indonesian capital regional free-to-air television channel broadcasting from the Jabodetabek area. It owned by Mahaka Media and launched in 31 October 2004.

JakTV's programming is focused towards news, air magazines and soft news. As of August 2018, JakTV transforms its broadcasting into 24 hours airtime, and added a new slogan "Dari Jakarta Untuk Indonesia" (From Jakarta to Indonesia).

History 
Jak TV was originally a joint venture between Mahaka Media, Artha Graha Network and Jawa Pos Group. In 2005, City TV Network, a joint effort of Indonesian local television, coordinated by Jak TV began.

On 30 October 2010, Jak TV held a 5K Fun Walk in the framework of the Jak TV 5th anniversary celebration which included the Jakartaku Peace Declaration, attended by 4000 participants.

The Jak TV 6th anniversary was attended by 6326 participants on 30 October 2011.

In 2016, Jak TV broadcast Serie A matches for two seasons (2016–17 and 2017–18).

In 2017, Jak TV also covers both Inter Milan's International Champions Cup Singapore matches.

In 2019, Jak TV broadcast selected live and most delayed Premier League matches for three seasons (2019-20 until 2021-22), plus highlights. Jak TV also broadcast four live games (both semi finals and both gold-bronze finals) of the 2019 FIBA World Cup in-simulcast with the national public broadcaster TVRI.

Recognition 

 Award from UNICEF and WHO as a station that promoted the dangers of polio in Indonesia and how to handle it regularly (16 November 2005).
 MURI record for Kentongan Peace (2011)
 Adikarya Wisata award from the DKI Jakarta Disparbud Department as the best local station for tourism and culture of DKI Jakarta (4 December 2012).

References

External links 
 Official Site

Television stations in Indonesia
Television channels and stations established in 2004
2004 establishments in Indonesia
Mass media in Jakarta
Mahaka Media